The Stade Robert Bobin is a multi-purpose stadium in Bondoufle, France. It is used for football matches and is the home stadium of Paris FC (women). It hosted the 1996 French Athletics Championships. The stadium holds 18,850 spectators.

External links
Stadium information

Robert Bobin
Sports venues in Essonne
Sports venues completed in 1994
1994 establishments in France